Ryansdóttir is a surname of Icelandic origin, meaning daughter of Ryan. In Icelandic names, the name is not strictly a surname, but a patronymic (see Icelandic names). Since Ryan is a rare name in Iceland, the number of girls with the last name Ryansdóttir is extremely rare. Seen slightly more frequently is the patrynomic, Ryansson, which would mean the son of Ryan.

Surnames